Havasu is the sixth studio album by American indie rock band Pedro the Lion. It was a surprise release, released on January 20, 2022, through Polyvinyl Record Co.

It is the sequel to their previous album Phoenix and details songwriter David Bazan's childhood in the city of Lake Havasu City, Arizona

Track listing

Personnel
Pedro the Lion
 David Bazan – vocals, all instruments, production, cover photography
 Sean Lane – "the bike" (all tracks), percussion (tracks 3, 4, 8)
 Erik Walters

Additional contributors
 Andy D. Park – production, mixing, engineering (all tracks); keyboards (5), additional keyboards (4, 8)
 Chris Colbert – mastering
 Jesse LeDoux – art direction
 Ryan Russell – studio photography

Notes

References

2022 albums
Pedro the Lion albums
Polyvinyl Record Co. albums